Edmund Henry Garrett (1853–1929) was an American illustrator, bookplate-maker, and author—as well as a highly respected painter—renowned for his illustrations of the legends of King Arthur.

Biography

Garrett was born in Albany, New York on October 19, 1853.  While little is known of his initial art education, Garrett rose through the ranks to become a distinguished member of the Boston Art Club and the Copley Society of Art, and was an acquaintance and colleague of renowned impressionist artist Childe Hassam. He studied at the Académie Julian in Paris under Gustave Boulanger, Jules Lefebvre, John Paul Laurens, and Hector Leroux.  After residing in Paris for approximately five years, he returned to America to establish a successful studio in Boston.

His first original wood engraving was created in 1879 under the tutelage of Robert Swain Gifford. His first original prints specialized in both architectural views and landscapes, with his later etchings mostly featuring areas around Boston.

Garrett provided the chief influence for Childe Hassam's first study trip to Europe in July 1883.  On June 30, 1883, Garrett and Hassam sailed to Europe aboard the SS Anchoria, then travelled for several months throughout Great Britain, The Netherlands, France, Italy, Switzerland and Spain studying paintings from the old masters and creating watercolors of the European countryside.  In late August 1883, both Garrett and Hassam sailed aboard the SS Alsatia to several Spanish ports before crossing the Atlantic back home.

After they both returned to Boston, Garrett resumed his illustration work for various publishers, which was very much in demand, keeping him from spending energy on his watercolors.

In 1884, Garrett exhibited two watercolors at the Pennsylvania Academy ("A Street in Granada" and "El Mirador de la Reina, Alhambra") in 1884.  He also exhibited "A Street in Granada" at the "Third Annual Exhibition of the Paint and Clay Club," which was held at the Gallery of the Boston Art Club in March 1884.

During the last two decades of the nineteenth century, Edmund Garrett's paintings and etchings were widely exhibited throughout the United States and in France at the Paris Salon.

During his lifetime, Garrett was a prolific illustrator of many books and publications, including various books of poetry by Tennyson, Keats, and Schiller; the Legends of King Arthur; Austen's Pride & Prejudice; Marie Louise de la Ramée's (Ouida's) A Dog of Flanders; stories by Alexandre Dumas; various books of Elizabethan and Victorian songs; and other books by Longfellow, Sir Walter Scott, Shelley, Wordsworth, and Hawthorne, among others.

Today, Garrett's works adorn the walls of the Art Institute of Chicago, Metropolitan Museum of Art in New York, and the New York Public Library, the Boston Public Library, and the Massachusetts State House.  Other works appear in collections at the Public Library in Winchester, Mass; Calumet Club (Boston, Mass.), Brookside Library; Conant Memorial Church; and the Fine Arts Museum of San Francisco.

Garrett died in Needham, Massachusetts on April 2, 1929.

Partial list of books illustrated/compiled by Edmund Garrett 

 The Village Blacksmith by Henry Wadsworth Longfellow, 1880
 Song of the Bell by Friedrich Schiller, 1882
 Come into the Garden, Maud by Alfred Tennyson, 1883
 Life on the Mississippi by Mark Twain, 1883
 Bingen on the Rhine by Caroline E.S. Norton, 1883
 Lady Clare by Alfred Tennyson, 1884
 Eve of St. Agnes by John Keats, 1885
 Favorite Poems and the High Tide on the Coast of Lincolnshire 1571 by Jean Ingelow, 1886
 Pilgrims of the Night collected and Illustrated by Edmund H. Garrett, 1887
 Ballads About Authors by Harriet Spofford, 1887
 The Closing Scene by Thomas Buchanan Read, 1887
 Christmas in the Olden Time by Sir Walter Scott, 1887
 Ballads of Romance & History by Susan Coolidge, et al., 1887
 Enoch Arden by Alfred Tennyson, 1888
 Fairy Lilian & Other Poems by Alfred Tennyson, 1888
 From Greenland's Icy Mountains by Bishop Heber, 1889
 Rab and His Friends by John Brown, 1890
 Annie & Willie's Prayer by Sophie P. Snow, 1890
 The Blind Musician by Vladimir Korolenko, 1890
 Jane Eyre: An Autobiography by Charlotte Brontë, 1890
 Elizabethan Songs in Honour of Love And Beautie, Compiled and Illustrated by Edmund Henry Garrett, 1891
 Roses of Romance from the Poems of John Keats, Selected and Illustrated by Edmund H. Garrett, 1891
 Flowers of Fancy by Percy Shelley, 1891
 Ailes d'Alouette by F.W. Bourdillon, 1891
 The Novels of Jame Austen (Volumes 1 through 6) by Jane Austen, 1892
 Bimbi, Stories for Children by Ouida (Maria Louise Ramé), 1892
 Poems by William Wordsworth, edited by Matthew Arnold, 1892
 Echoes from the Sabine Farm by Eugene & Rowell Martin Field, 1893
 Yanko the Musician & Other Stories by Henryk Sienkiewicz, 1893
 Three Heroines of New England Romance by Harriet P. Spofford, 1894
 Victorian Songs: Lyrics of the Affections and Nature, Edited and Illustrated by Edmund H. Garrett, 1895
 Carmen: A Memoir by Prosper Mérimée, 1896
 Camilla: A Novel by Richert Von Koch, 1896
 Romances and Reality of the Puritan Coast by Edmund H. Garrett, 1897
 Two Little Wooden Shoes: A Story by Ouida (Maria Louise Ramé), 1897
 Quo Vadis: A Narrative of the Time of Nero by Henryk Sienkiewicz, 1897
 Hypatia or New Foes with Old Faces by Charle Kingsley and Edmund H. Garrett, 1897
 The She-Wolves Of Machecoul; A Romance Of The Last Vendee; to which is added The Corsican Brothers; in two volumes. The Romances of Alexandre Dumas: volumes forty-four, and forty-five by Alexandre Dumas, 1897
 Twenty Years After; A Romance Of The Regency Of Anne Of Austria, in two volumes. The Romances of Alexandre Dumas: volumes eighteen, and nineteen by Alexandre Dumas, 1897
 The Gray House of the Quarries" by Mary Harriott Norris, 1898
 The Nurnberg Stove by Ouida (Maria Louise Ramé), 1898
 An Account of Anne Bradstreet, The Puritan Poetess & Kindred Topics edited by Colonel Luther Caldwell, 1898
 Rubaiyat of Omar Khayyam by Khayyam Omar, 1898
 By the Fireside; A Book of Good Stories for Young People Illustrated by Edmund H. Garrett, 1898
 Backlog Studies by Charles Dudley Warner, 1899
 The Hunter Cats by Helen Jackson, 1899
 The Three Musketeers by Alexandre Dumas, 1899
 Notes of Travel by Nathaniel Hawthorne, 1900
 Legends of King Arthur and His Court by Frances Nimmo Greene, 1901
 The Pilgrim Shore of the Massachusetts Coast by Edmund H. Garrett, 1900
 Celebrated Crimes by Alexandre Dumas, 1902
 The Night Has a Thousand Eyes & Other Poems by F.W. Bourdillon, 1903
 Bookplates Selected from the Works of Edmund H. Garrett, and a Notice of Them by Wililam Howe Downes, 1904
 Vicomte de Bragelonne (Vol. III) by Alexandre Dumas, 1904
 Stories from Famous Ballads by Grace Greenwood (Sara Jane Lippincott) and edited by Caroline Burnite, 1906
 Snow-Bound: A Writers Idyl by John Greenleaf Whittier, 1906. (Reprinted in 2007)
 Venetian Life by William Dean Howells, 1907
 A Dog of Flanders & Other Stories by Ouida (Maria Louise Ramé), 1910
 Travelers Five Along Life's Highway: Jimmy, Gideon Wiggan, The Clown, Wexley Snathers, Bap. Sloan by Annie Fellows Johnson, 1911
 The Sword of Bussy, or the Word of a Gentleman by Robert Neilson Stephens and Herman Nickerson, 1912
 The Island of Beautiful Things: A Romance of the South by Will Allen Dromgoole, 1912
 John O'Partletts: A Tale of Strife and Courage by Jean Edgerton Hovey, 1913
 Moufflou and Other Stories by Ouida (Maria Louise Ramé), 1910
 A Flower of Monterey (A Romance of the Californias) by Katherine B. Hamill, 1921

List of his March 1884 exhibited watercolors
 A Street in Granada Boats at Venice Study of a Chateau Gateway March in New England Early Spring, Milton Meadows Street in Denia, Spain Rock of DumbartonReferences

2. The Mark Twain Encyclopedia'' edited by J. R. LeMaster, James Darrell Wilson, Christie Graves Hamric, Garland Publishing, Inc., New York and London, 1993

External links

Boston Art Club:  Official website
 
 
 Article about Edmund Garrett on AskArt.com
 Article about Edmund Garrett on FineOldArt.com
 Article about Edmund Garrett on ArtofthePrint.com
 Bookplates by Edmund H. Garrett in the University of Delaware Library's William Augustus Brewer Bookplate Collection

Artists from Boston
American illustrators
American male writers
1853 births
1929 deaths
19th century in Boston
Cultural history of Boston